Brachyscome bellidioides is a species of flowering plant in the family Asteraceae and is endemic to the southwest of Western Australia. It is an annual herb with linear leaves and yellow and white daisy-like flowers.

Description

Taxonomy and naming
Brachyscome bellidioides was first formally described in 1845 by Joachim Steetz in Lehmann's Plantae Preissianae. The specific epithet (bellidioides) means Bellis-like.

Distribution and habitat
This species of daisy usually grows on sand in heathland and is found in near-coastal areas between Jurien Bay and King George Sound in the Jarrah Forest, Swan Coastal Plain and Warren bioregions of south-western Western Australia.

Conservation status
Brachyscome bellidioides is listed as "not threatened" by the Government of Western Australia Department of Biodiversity, Conservation and Attractions.

References

bellidioides
Flora of Western Australia
Plants described in 1845
Taxa named by Joachim Steetz